is a railway station in Suruga-ku, Shizuoka, Shizuoka Prefecture, Japan, operated by the private railway company, Shizuoka Railway (Shizutetsu).

Lines
Sakurabashi Station is a station on the Shizuoka–Shimizu Line and is 10.0 kilometers from the starting point of the line at Shin-Shizuoka Station.

Station layout
The station has two parallel side platforms, which are offset from each other, with a level crossing connecting the two platforms. The station entrance is located in between the platforms towards the south. and has automated ticket machines, and automated turnstiles, which accept the LuLuCa smart card ticketing system as well as the PiTaPa and ICOCA IC cards. The station is wheelchair accessible only in the Shin-Shizuoka direction, as access to the other platform is only via stairs.

Platforms

Adjacent stations

Station history
Sakurabashi Station was established on December 9, 1908.

Passenger statistics
In fiscal 2017, the station was used by an average of 2300 passengers daily (boarding passengers only).

Surrounding area
Sakuragaoka High School

See also
 List of railway stations in Japan

References

External links

 Shizuoka Railway official website

Railway stations in Shizuoka Prefecture
Railway stations in Japan opened in 1908
Railway stations in Shizuoka (city)